Mohd Robani Hassan (born 18 January 1983) is a retired Malaysian athlete who specialised in the sprint hurdles events. He won several medals at the regional level, including gold at the 2005 SEA Games in Manila. He represented his country at the 2004 World Indoor Championships without reaching the semifinals.

He has personal bests of 13.85 seconds in the 110 metres hurdles (2008) and 8.03 seconds in the 60 metres hurdles (2004).

Competition record

References

1983 births
Living people
Malaysian people of Malay descent
Malaysian male hurdlers
Athletes (track and field) at the 2006 Asian Games
Southeast Asian Games medalists in athletics
Southeast Asian Games gold medalists for Malaysia
Southeast Asian Games silver medalists for Malaysia
Competitors at the 2003 Southeast Asian Games
Competitors at the 2005 Southeast Asian Games
Competitors at the 2009 Southeast Asian Games
Asian Games competitors for Malaysia
21st-century Malaysian people